Cuba: My Revolution is a semiautobiographical graphic novel written by Inverna Lockpez with art by Dean Haspiel and colours by Jose Villarubia. It was published by DC Comics imprint Vertigo.

Plot
The story is set in Cuba in 1959, when 17-year old medical student Sonya dreams of becoming a painter. Encouraged by the ideals of the Cuban Revolution she joins the militia and is sent to the Bay of Pigs, where she's imprisoned and tortured by her own comrades. She returns home, but discovers her opinions are not in line with Fidel Castro's regime.

Reception 
Cuba: My Revolution was covered by, among others, NPR's Tell Me More, the New York Post, and Graphic Novel Reporter.

References

External links
Graphic, Novel: Cuba: My Revolution Brings the Harsh Reality of Castro’s Revolution to Comics. Interview with Dean Haspiel on Publishing Perspectives.
Inverna Lockpez's Cuba: Remembering a Revolution. Interview with Inverna Lockpez from Graphic Novel Reporter.

2010 graphic novels
2010 comics debuts
Autobiographical graphic novels
Vertigo Comics graphic novels
Comics set in Cuba
Comics set in the 1950s
Comics set in the 1960s
Cultural depictions of Fidel Castro
Comics about politics